The Civic Government (Scotland) Act 1982 is an Act of the United Kingdom Parliament which makes provision for a wide range of civic government matters.

Effects of the Act
Parts I and II of the Act deal with licensing by local authorities of a range of activities including taxis and private hire cars, second-hand dealers, metal dealers, boat hire, street traders, market operators, public entertainment, indoor sports entertainment and window cleaners.

Part III deals with the control of sex shops.

Part IV sets out a range of public nuisance offences, including soliciting and importuning by prostitutes, urination or defecation in public places, dog fouling, dangerous animals, drunkenness, display, publication etc. of obscene material, obstruction by pedestrians, ticket touting, causing annoyance by playing of instruments, radios &c. Sections 52 and 52A create offences of possession, making and distribution etc. of indecent images of children.

Part V deals with public processions.

Part VI, VII and VIIA deal with lost or abandoned property, and the property of people taken into police custody.

Part VIII deals with local authorities' powers as regards buildings in need of maintenance and maintenance of common stairs.

References

External links
 Civic Government (Scotland) Act 1982, as currently in force, on the UK Statute Law database

1982 in Scotland
Acts of the Parliament of the United Kingdom concerning Scotland
United Kingdom Acts of Parliament 1982
Omnibus legislation